Dibrugarh Town railway station is the Oldest station in Northeast, India. Its code is DBRT. It serves Dibrugarh City & 2nd most busy station after Dibrugarh railway station(DBRG). The station consists of three platforms. The is well developed and support many facilities including footover bridges,well sheltered platform,food,water etc.The station is home of the two Rajdhani Express.|

Major trains

Some of the important trains that runs from Dibrugarh are :

 Dibrugarh Rajdhani Express
 Dibrugarh Town–New Delhi Rajdhani Express (via Kanpur)

References

Railway stations in Dibrugarh district
Tinsukia railway division